Wildside Records is an independent New Zealand record label, owned and run by former Rip It Up magazine editor, Murray Cammick.

Current artists include
HLAH
Shihad
Slim
Graham Brazier

See also
 Best of Wildside
 List of record labels

References

New Zealand independent record labels
Alternative rock record labels
IFPI members